

Oman
 Mombasa – Nasr ibn Abdallah al-Mazru‘i, Wali of Mombasa (1698–1728)

Portugal
 Angola – Paulo Caetano de Albuquerque, Governor of Angola (1726–1732)
 Macau –
 Antonio Carneiro de Alcacova, Governor of Macau (1724–1727)
 Antonio Moniz Barreto, Governor of Macau (1727–1732)

Colonial governors
Colonial governors
1727